Pterobothris is a genus of beetles in the family Buprestidae, containing the following species:

 Pterobothris barrigae Moore, 2006
 Pterobothris corrosus Fairmaire & Germain, 1858

References

Buprestidae genera